Mordaunt is both a surname and a given name. Notable people with the name include:

Surname
Charles Mordaunt (disambiguation), several earls and baronets
Harry Mordaunt (1663–1720), English lieutenant-general
Henry Mordaunt (Royal Navy officer) (died 1710), English politician and Royal Navy captain
David Mordaunt (born 1937), English former cricketer
Elinor Mordaunt (1872–1942), English author and traveler
Gerald Mordaunt (1873–1959), English cricketer
Harriet Mordaunt (1848–1906), wife of Sir Charles Mordaunt, 10th Baronet, and alleged mistress of Edward VII
Henry Mordaunt, 2nd Earl of Peterborough (1621–1697), English soldier, peer, and courtier
Sir Henry Mordaunt, 12th Baronet (1867–1939), English cricketer
John Mordaunt (disambiguation), numerous persons
Lewis Mordaunt, 3rd Baron Mordaunt (1538-1601), English peer and politician
Norman Mordaunt, co-founder in 1967 of British loudspeaker company Mordaunt-Short
Osbert Mordaunt (cricketer, born 1842) (1842–1923), English cricketer and clergyman
Osbert Mordaunt (cricketer, born 1876) (1876–1949), English cricketer
Penny Mordaunt (born 1973), British politician
Thomas Osbert Mordaunt (1730–1809), British officer and poet

Given name
Mordaunt Bisset (1825–c. 1884), British politician and Member of Parliament
Mordaunt Cracherode (died 1773 or possibly 1768), British Army officer
J. Mordaunt Crook (born 1937), English architectural historian
Mordaunt Doll (1888–1966), English cricketer
Mordaunt Hall (1878–1973), American film critic
Sir Mordaunt Martin, 4th Baronet (c. 1740–1815), English country gentleman
Mordaunt Shairp (1887–1939), English dramatist and screenwriter

Fictional characters
Mordaunt, a main villain of the 1845 novel Twenty Years After by Alexandre Dumas
Mordaunt, the central male character in the 1800 novel Mordaunt, Sketches of Life, Characters, and Manners in Various Countries; including the memoirs of a French Lady of Quality by John Moore (Scottish physician)
Mordaunt Heatherstone, son of General John Berthier Heatherstone in the 1888 novel The Mystery of Cloomber by Arthur Conan Doyle

See also
DeMordaunt

English-language masculine given names